Yuri Alekseyevich Sobol (born March 20, 1966) is a former Russian professional footballer.

Club career
He made his professional debut in the Soviet First League in 1983 for FC Kuban Krasnodar.

References

1966 births
Living people
Soviet footballers
Russian footballers
Association football forwards
FC Kuban Krasnodar players
FC SKA Rostov-on-Don players
FC Samtredia players
FC Vorskla Poltava players
FC Tekstilshchik Kamyshin players
FC Lada-Tolyatti players
FC Kremin Kremenchuk players
Soviet Top League players
Erovnuli Liga players
Russian Premier League players
Ukrainian Premier League players
Ukrainian First League players
Russian expatriate footballers
Expatriate footballers in Georgia (country)
Expatriate footballers in Ukraine